Kota Laksamana is a state constituency in Malacca, Malaysia, that has been represented in the Melaka State Legislative Assembly.

The state constituency was first contested in 2004 and is mandated to return a single Assemblyman to the Melaka State Legislative Assembly under the first-past-the-post voting system. , the State Assemblyman for Kota Laksamana is Low Chee Leong from the Democratic Action Party (DAP) which is part of the state's opposition coalition, Pakatan Harapan (PH).

Definition 
The Kota Laksamana constituency contains the polling districts of Kesidang Indah, Tun Perak, Kampung Enam, Pengkalan Rama Pantai, Kenanga Seksyen 1, Kenanga Seksyen 2, Kenanga Seksyen 3, Tengkera Pantai, Tengkera, Kubu, Kampung Morten, Pengkalan Rama, Kampung Hulu, Kampung Belanda, Kampung Mata Kuching and Taman Kota Laksamana.

Demographics

History

Polling districts
According to the gazette issued on 31 October 2022, the Kota Laksamana constituency has a total of 15 polling districts.

Representation history

Election results

References

Malacca state constituencies